Khobriz (also Romanized as Khobrīz; also known as Khūb Rīz and Khūbrīz) is a village in Khobriz Rural District, in the Central District of Arsanjan County, Fars Province, Iran. At the 2006 census, its population was 1,384, in 316 families.

References 

Populated places in Arsanjan County